Catalina Bar & Grill, popularly referred to as Catalina Jazz Club, is a prominent jazz club and restaurant on Sunset Boulevard in Hollywood, Los Angeles, USA, located to the east of Hollywood High School and to the west of the Blessed Sacrament Catholic Church. It regularly hosts live music and according to Los Angeles Magazine hosts the "top names in mainstream and contemporary jazz [who] turn up regularly at this intimate supper club".  Jazz for Dummies cites it as one of the prime jazz venues in Los Angeles. Over the years artists such as Dizzie Gillespie, Art Blakey, McCoy Tyner, Larry Coryell, Chick Corea, Joe Zawinul, Ray Brown, Joe Williams, Arturo Sandoval, Max Roach, Carmen McRae, Betty Carter, Ron Carter, Joe Henderson, Marcus Miller, Benny Carter, Tony Williams, Wynton Marsalis, Branford Marsalis, Joshua Redman, Michael Brecker, Dee Dee Bridgewater, Jerry Bell, John Pizzarelli, Jimmy Scott, and Wayne Bergeron have played at the Catalina.

See also
 List of supper clubs

References

External links
Official website
Tripadvisor reviews

Buildings and structures in Hollywood, Los Angeles
Jazz clubs in Los Angeles
Restaurants in Los Angeles
Sunset Boulevard (Los Angeles)
Supper clubs